Sir Francis Atherton is a British physician who is the Chief Medical Officer for Wales.

Background
Atherton is originally from Lancashire, England. He graduated from the University of Leeds in 1982 and became a consultant in public health medicine in 1997.

Career
Atherton was formerly deputy chief medical officer in the Department of Health and Wellness in Nova Scotia, Canada, director of public health in north Lancashire, and president of the UK Association of Directors of Public Health. He was appointed as Chief Medical Officer for Wales in April 2016, following the retirement of the previous postholder,  Dr Ruth Hussey.

During the COVID-19 pandemic in Wales, Atherton said that he was attempting to reduce the risk of transmission by taking "all appropriate measures".

Atherton was knighted in the 2022 New Year Honours for services to public health.

References

External links 

Living people
Alumni of the University of Leeds
British public health doctors
Chief Medical Officers for Wales
Year of birth missing (living people)
Knights Bachelor
Medical doctors from Lancashire
21st-century English medical doctors